Fadafen (also Romanized as Fadāfen; also known as Fadāfin) is a village in Bala Velayat Rural District, in the Central District of Kashmar County, Razavi Khorasan Province, Iran. At the 2006 census, its population was 3,731, in 1,009 families.

References 

Populated places in Kashmar County